Liu Yuejun (born September 1954) is a general (shangjiang) of the People's Liberation Army (PLA) of China who served as commander of the Eastern Theater Command from 2016 to 2019.

Biography
Liu traces his ancestry to Rongcheng, Shandong, but he was born in Guangdong, where both of his parents were serving in the military. His given name, Yuejun, literally means "Guangdong army". He joined the army when he was 14 years old. He joined the 41st Army. In 1989 he became the chief of general staff of the 91st division of the 41st army. In 1993 he took charge of the Shenzhen preparatory force of the Hong Kong Garrison; he then successively led the 121st and 123rd divisions. In October 1998 he was named chief of general staff of the 41st Group Army. In April 1999 he became the commander of the Macao Garrison. In June 2007 he became chief of general staff of the Lanzhou Military Region. He was promoted to lieutenant-general in July 2008. In October 2012 he was named commander of the Lanzhou Military Region.

On 31 July 2015, Liu Yuejun was promoted to general (shang jiang), the highest rank for Chinese military officers in active service. On February 1, 2016, Liu was named commander of the re-organized Eastern Theater Command.

In August 2020, he was appointed vice chairperson of the National People's Congress Social Development Affairs Committee.

Liu was an alternate member of the 16th and 17th Central Committee of the Chinese Communist Party, and is a full member of the 18th and 19th Central Committees.

References 

1954 births
Living people
People's Liberation Army generals from Guangdong
Members of the 19th Central Committee of the Chinese Communist Party
Members of the 18th Central Committee of the Chinese Communist Party
Alternate members of the 17th Central Committee of the Chinese Communist Party
Alternate members of the 16th Central Committee of the Chinese Communist Party
Chiefs of Staff of the Lanzhou Military Region
Commanders of the Lanzhou Military Region
Commanders of the People's Liberation Army Macau Garrison
Delegates to the 13th National People's Congress